The EMD AEM-7 is a twin-cab four-axle  B-B electric locomotive built by Electro-Motive Division (EMD) and ASEA between 1978 and 1988. The locomotive is a derivative of the Swedish SJ Rc4 designed for passenger service in the United States. The primary customer was Amtrak, which bought 54 for use on the Northeast Corridor and Keystone Corridor. Two commuter operators, MARC and SEPTA, also purchased locomotives, for a total of 65.

Amtrak ordered the AEM-7 after the failure of the GE E60 locomotive. The first locomotives entered service in 1980 and were an immediate success, ending a decade of uncertainty on the Northeast Corridor. In the late 1990s, Amtrak rebuilt 29 of its locomotives from DC to AC traction. The locomotives continued operating through the arrival of the final Siemens ACS-64 in June 2016. MARC retired its fleet in April 2017 in favor of Siemens Chargers, and SEPTA retired all seven of its AEM-7s in November 2018 in favor of ACS-64s.

Background 

Amtrak assumed control of almost all private sector intercity passenger rail service in the United States on May 1, 1971, with a mandate to reverse decades of decline. Amtrak retained approximately 184 of the 440 trains which had run the day before. To operate these trains, Amtrak inherited a fleet of 300 locomotives (electric and diesel) and 1190 passenger cars, most of which dated from the 1940s–1950s.

Operation on the electrified portion of the Northeast Corridor was split between the Budd Metroliner electric multiple units and PRR GG1 locomotives. Amtrak sought a replacement, but no US manufacturer offered an electric passenger locomotive. Importing and adapting a European locomotive would require a three-year lead time. With few other options, Amtrak turned to GE to adapt the E60C freight locomotive for passenger service. GE delivered two models, the E60CP and the E60CH. However, the locomotives proved unsuitable for speeds above , leaving Amtrak once again in need of a permanent solution.

Amtrak then examined existing European high-speed designs, and two were imported for trials in 1976–77: the Swedish SJ Rc4 (Amtrak  X995, SJ No. 1166), and the French SNCF Class CC 21000 (Amtrak No. X996, SNCF No. 21003). Amtrak favored the Swedish design, which became the basis for the AEM-7.

Design 

The AEM-7 was far smaller than its predecessors, the PRR GG1 and the GE E60. The AEM-7's weight was half that of the E60CP or the GG1. On its introduction it was the "smallest and lightest high horsepower locomotive in North America." The Budd Company manufactured the carbodies for the initial Amtrak order, while the Austrian firm Simmering-Graz-Pauker built the carbodies for the MARC and SEPTA orders.

Reflecting the varied electrification schemes on the Northeast Corridor the locomotives could operate at three different voltages: 11 kV 25 Hz AC, 12.5 kV 60 Hz AC and 25 kV 60 Hz. A pair of Faiveley DS-11 two-stage pantographs, one at each end of the locomotive, collected power from the overhead catenary wire. Thyristor converters stepped down the high-voltage AC to provide DC power at a much lower voltage to four traction motors, one per axle. A separate static converter supplied 500 kW 480 V head-end power (HEP) for passenger comfort. This was sufficient to supply heating, lighting, and other electrical needs in 8-10 Amfleet cars.

AEM-7AC 

The rebuilt AEM-7ACs used AC traction instead of DC traction. The remanufactured AEM-7ACs were the world's first passenger locomotives to incorporate IGBT technology.

History 

Amtrak planned a fleet of 53 locomotives, with an estimated cost of $137.5 million. Limited funding hampered that plan, but in September 1977 Amtrak proceeded with a plan to buy 30 locomotives for $77.8 million. Five groups bid on the contract: General Motors' Electro-Motive Division (EMD)/ASEA, Morrison–Knudsen/Alstom, Brown Boveri, Siemens/KraussMaffei, and AEG/KraussMaffei. Amtrak awarded the contract to the EMD/ASEA partnership in January 1978. It ordered 17 more locomotives in February 1980, bringing the total to 47.

Revenue service began on May 9, 1980, when No. 901 departed Washington Union Station with a Metroliner service. The Swedish influence led to the nickname "Meatball", after Swedish meatballs. Railfans nicknamed the boxy locomotives "toasters". Between 1980 and 1982, 47 AEM-7s (Nos. 900–946) went into service. Amtrak retired the last of its PRR GG1s on May 1, 1981, while most of the GE E60s were sold to other operators. The new locomotives swiftly proved themselves; Car and Locomotive Cyclopedia stated that no new locomotive since the New York Central Hudson had "such an impact on speeds and schedule performance."

This strong performance led to further orders. Amtrak added seven more locomotives in 1987, delivered in 1988, for a total of 54. Two commuter operators in the Northeast ordered AEM-7s. MARC ordered four in 1986 for use on its Penn Line service on the Northeast Corridor between Washington, D.C. and Perryville, Maryland. The Southeastern Pennsylvania Transportation Authority (SEPTA) ordered seven in 1987. Amtrak also used the AEM-7s to handle the Keystone Service on the Keystone Corridor between Harrisburg and Philadelphia as the Budd Metroliners, displaced from the Northeast Corridor, reached the end of their service lives.

Refurbishment 
In 1999, Amtrak and Alstom began a remanufacturing program for Amtrak's AEM-7s. Alstom supplied AC propulsion equipment, electrical cabinets, transformers, HEP, and cab displays. The rebuild provided Amtrak with locomotives that had improved high end tractive effort and performance with longer trains. Amtrak workers performed the overhauls under Alstom supervision at Amtrak's shop in Wilmington, Delaware. These remanufactured AEM-7s were designated AEM-7AC. Between 1999 and 2002, Amtrak rebuilt 29 of its AEM-7s.

Retirement 
As the locomotives passed 30 years of service their operators made plans for replacements. In 2010, Amtrak ordered 70 Siemens ACS-64 locomotives to replace both the AEM-7s and the newer but unreliable Bombardier/Alstom HHP-8s. The ACS-64s began entering revenue service in February 2014. The last two active AEM-7s, Amtrak Nos. 942 and 946, made their final run on June 18, 2016, on a special farewell excursion that ran between Washington, D.C. and Philadelphia.

While Amtrak was replacing its AEM-7s, MARC initially decided in 2013 to phase out its electric operations on the Penn Line altogether and retire both its AEM-7 and Bombardier–Alstom HHP-8 locomotives, but the railroad instead started a refurbishment program for its HHP-8s in 2017. , the first HHP-8 reconditioned under this program had been delivered and was undergoing successful testing. MARC selected the Siemens Charger diesel locomotive as the replacement for its AEM-7 fleet in 2015. The last of the MARC AEM-7s were retired by April 2017, with the Chargers expected to enter service by January 2018.

SEPTA will continue to use electric traction, replacing its seven AEM-7s and lone ABB ALP-44, an improved AEM-7, with fifteen ACS-64s. The first SEPTA ACS-64, #901, entered revenue service on July 11, 2018. On December 1, 2018, SEPTA held a farewell excursion for the AEM-7 and ALP-44 locomotives along the Paoli/Thorndale Line.

Post-retirement 

Two locomotives, ex-Amtrak Nos. 928 and 942, were moved to the Transportation Technology Center in July 2017.

Caltrain, which operates commuter trains in the San Francisco Bay Area, purchased two retired Amtrak AEM-7s to test their electrification system once completed. The units would also serve as backup power for EMU cars. On June 7, 2018, the board awarded two contracts totalling approximately $600,000: one to purchase two AEM-7ACs from Mitsui & Co, and the other to Amtrak for refurbishment, training, and transportation to the Caltrain maintenance facility in San Jose. Locomotive Nos. 929 and 938 were delivered to California by Amtrak in June 2019.

Seven of the remaining SEPTA AEM-7s were leased to NJ Transit beginning in late December 2018 for the purpose of allowing NJ Transit to roster additional locomotives equipped with positive train control (PTC) in order to meet a deadline for operating PTC-capable equipment. However, they were never used and subsequently returned. SEPTA then used them exclusively for overnight work service during autumn, cleaning tracks and applying traction gel. In 2022, SEPTA sold the AEM-7s and ALP-44 for scrap.

Two units have been preserved: ex-Amtrak Nos. 915 at the Railroad Museum of Pennsylvania, and 945 at the Illinois Railway Museum.

See also 
 ABB ALP-44

Notes

References

Further reading

External links 

 AEM-7DC power, tractive effort, and braking curve graphs on page 11-27 (figures 11.2.10 – 11.2.12).
 AEM-7AC Completion Dates and Data by On Track On Line
 

Amtrak locomotives
AEM-7
ASEA locomotives
B-B locomotives
SEPTA Regional Rail
11 kV AC locomotives
25 kV AC locomotives
Passenger locomotives
Electric locomotives of the United States
Railway locomotives introduced in 1980
Multi-system locomotives
Passenger trains running at least at 200 km/h in commercial operations
Standard gauge locomotives of the United States